Mallosia graeca is a species of beetle in the subfamily Lamiinae, found only in the Greek mainland. The species is 13–30 mm long, and brown coloured. Its host plant is Eryngium.

References

Saperdini
Beetles of Europe
Endemic fauna of Greece
Beetles described in 1843